Jean-François Piège (born 25 September 1970) is a French chef, two stars at the Guide Michelin.

Training and career 
In 1991, he started working as a chef assistant for ten months at the Palais de l'Élysée during his military service. He worked notably with Bernard Vaussion, sous-chef at that time. After having worked with famous other chefs for several years (Bruno Cirino, Yves Camdeborde, Christian Constant, Alain Ducasse), he became the chef of the restaurant Les Ambassadeurs at the Hôtel de Crillon in Paris, not hesitating on mixing the codes of the palace with popular cuisine.

In 2009, he started a new project and created with his colleague Thierry Costes a place with a unique personality in Paris. The domain of Thoumieux is declined in different places : the Brasserie Thoumieux (2009), the restaurant Jean-François Piège (2010) and the Hôtel Thoumieux (2011).

In February 2011, Jean-François Piège received directly two Michelin stars for his restaurant. His colleagues named him a few months later chef of the year after a secret vote organised by the special magazine Le Chef among 6,000 professionals (cooking chefs, pastry chefs, sommeliers).

in 2014 he decides to go totally independently and opens Clover with his wife Élodie. The first of their restaurants, tucked away in the heart of Saint-Germain-des-Prés, offers a spontaneous and instinctive cuisine suited to the style of the intimate room where kitchen and restaurant become one. A year later the couple open the Grand Restaurant, his gastronomic establishment. Situated two steps away from the Gold Triangle of Paris it is a laboratory of careful thought and haute cuisine where the chef pushes the limits, discovers new boundaries of culinary art acquired through his many years of experience. The restaurant with its famous black and white fragmented glass ceiling is awarded two stars by the Guide Michelin in February 2016.

At the same Jean-François Piège opens in the centre of Paris another signature restaurant named the Clover Grill. Grilled or roasted on charcoal embers the incredible and luscious ingredients are revealed by the perfect mastering of the flames. A few doors down in the same area Jean-François Piège and his wife make another one of dreams come true by taking over the Poule au Pot and with this restaurant in their own going back in time to the values of the traditional French bourgeois cuisine. And finally in the evolution of the chef's cuisine at the beginning of 2018, Clover became Clover Green with a special focus on vegetables. A return to his roots, like a fundamental value of beyond the demonstration fore and foremost is the transmission of sharing pleasure and happiness.

Television 
He shares his knowledge and his passion through his books and as a guest in various television programs such as Un dîner presque parfait (the French version of Come Dine with Me) and 100% Mag on M6. From 2010 to 2019, he is a member of the jury in the French version of Top Chef on the same channel.

Honours 
2001 : 3 Michelin stars for the restaurant of the Plaza Athénée
2005 : 2 Michelin stars for the restaurant Les Ambassadeurs
2005 : Chef of the year by the guide Pudlo for the restaurant Les Ambassadeurs
2005 : Chef of the year by the guide Champérard for the restaurant Les Ambassadeurs
2007 : Chef of the year by the guide Gault et Millau for the restaurant Les Ambassadeurs
2008 : Chevalier (Knight) of the National Order of Merit
2010 : "Lillet / Lebey de l'Innovation" price for the Brasserie Thoumieux
2011 : "Omnivore Maison" price for the Hôtel Thoumieux
2011 : Event of the year by the guide Pudlo for the restaurant Jean-François Piège
2011 : 2 Michelin stars for the restaurant Jean-François Piège
2011 : Chef of the year by the revue Le Chef
2014 - Named "Creator of the Year" at the cooking festival OMNIVORE
2014 - Jean-François Piège nominated Vice-President of "Grandes Tables du Monde"
2016 - 2 Michelin stars for his restaurant Le Grand Restaurant in Paris, 8th arrondissement
2016 - Receives Lebey Prize for Best Meat dish for his "sweetbreads cooked over walnut shells"
2016 - Voted "Chef of the Year" by the 2016 Pudlo Guide
2016 - Voted "Chef of the Year" by the 2016 Champérard Guide
2017 - Clover Grill receives the "Coup de Cœur" awarded by the Guide Lebey Paris/London
2017 - Clover Grill voted as one of the best restaurants of the year in the 2017 Hot List of Condé Nast Traveller Magazine
2018 - Le Grand Restaurant voted best restaurant of the year by the World Luxury Restaurant Awards
2018 - Le Grand Restaurant scored 19/20 and five hats by the guide Gault & Millau
2019 - 1 Michelin star for his restaurant La Poule au Pot in Paris, 1st arrondissement

Books 
2007 - Côté Crillon, côté maison (Editions Flammarion)
2008 - Jean-François Piège dans votre cuisine (Editions Flammarion)
2011 - Le Petit Dictionnaire d’Alexandre Dumas et des recettes de Jean-François Piège (Editions J’ai Lu) et Best Of Jean-François Piège (Editions Alain Ducasse)
2013 - Manifeste L’art de manger (Editions Autrement) et Jean-François Piège (Editions Flammarion)
2014 - Jean-François Piège, English version (Editions Flammarion) et Jean-François Piège, le poisson à sa façon (Kéribus Editions)
2016 - Jean-François Piège pour tous (Editions Hachette)
2017 - Les desserts de Jean-François Piège pour tous (Editions Hachette)
2018 - Zéro gras (Editions Hachette)
2019 - Les Tartes de Jean-François Piège pour tous (Editions Hachette)

Television programs 
2008 to 2011 - Un dîner Presque parfait on channel M6 : Head judge seasons 2 to 4
2010 to 2019 - Top Chef on channel M6 : Head judge from seasons 1 to 10

See also 
List of Michelin starred restaurants

References

External links 
Official site 

1970 births
French chefs
People from Valence, Drôme
Living people
Head chefs of Michelin starred restaurants